Samuel Walsh (August 31, 1916 – March 18, 2008), was leader of the Communist Party of Quebec for 28 years, from 1962 to 1990, and was a leader in the Communist Party of Canada and Labor-Progressive Party since the 1940s.

Early life and education
Walsh was born in Montreal as Saul Jerome Wolofsky. His father was Hirsch Wolofsky, publisher of the Keneder Adler (Canadian Eagle), Canada's first Yiddish newspaper.

At the age of 17, Wolofsky took part in a student strike against an increase in high school tuition fees. He became a Communist with the encouragement of his older brother, Moishe, a union organizer. His father asked them to change their names to avoid embarrassing the family and so Moishe became Bill Walsh and Saul became Sam Walsh.

Walsh enrolled in biology at McGill University and obtained a Bachelor of Science degree in 1938. He moved to Toronto.

Career
Walsh ran for public office at least 30 times in his career, and was elected twice as a school trustee in Toronto in the late 1940s.

When the Communist Party was banned in 1940, Walsh went underground and evaded arrest under the wartime Defence of Canada Regulations. Once the Nazis invaded the Soviet Union, the USSR became Canada's ally and Communists were able to organize the new Labor-Progressive Party as a legal front.

Walsh enlisted in the Canadian Army during World War II, becoming a second lieutenant instructing soldiers how to operate military vehicles. He was denied further promotion because of his political affiliations. According to his niece, "His commanding officer told him, 'Sam, I'd like to promote you, but I understand you're pink.'" Walsh replied “I'm not pink, I'm flaming red.”

Walsh became a permanent party organizer for the Labor-Progressive Party following Fred Rose's election victory in 1943.
 
In 1948, Walsh was elected to the Toronto Board of Education by acclamation and was re-elected in 1949 before being defeated in 1950.

Walsh ran in the 1958 federal election in Spadina and then in a by-election in Trinity, both Toronto ridings, but was unsuccessful.

He returned to Montreal in the 1960s becoming leader of the Communist Party of Quebec in 1962. In 1972, he denounced Trotskyist support for Quebec independence resulting in a number of defections from the party.

Electoral record

References

Quebec political party leaders
Candidates in Quebec provincial elections
1916 births
2008 deaths
Communist Party of Quebec politicians
Labor-Progressive Party candidates in the 1958 Canadian federal election
Communist Party of Canada candidates in the 1962 Canadian federal election
Jewish Canadian politicians
McGill University Faculty of Science alumni